Highland School may refer to:
 Highland School (Boulder, Colorado), listed on the National Register of Historic Places (NRHP)
 Highland School (Atlanta, Georgia), listed on the NRHP in Fulton County, Georgia 
Highland School (Reading, Massachusetts), NRHP-listed
 Highland School (Hickory, North Carolina), listed on the NRHP in Catawba County, North Carolina
 Highland School (Warrenton, Virginia)
 The Highland School, (Ellenboro, West Virginia)